Daniela del Carmen Alvarado Álvarez (born 23 October 1981 in Caracas) is a Venezuelan television, theatre and film actress. She is the daughter of actor Daniel Alvarado and actress Carmen Julia Álvarez and has 6 brothers.

She broke into international fame as the star of RCTV's telenovela Juana la virgen.

Biography
Through the influence of her parents, Daniela ventured into the world of acting at the age of 4 in Macu, The Policeman's Woman. She later studied ballet and entered a children's dance group called Los Minipops.
Since then, she has appeared in numerous telenovelas for RCTV and Venevisión.

Filmography

References

External links 
 
 Juana la virgen in Subtv 
 Coral International in TV Asia
 Official biography in RCTV homepage 

Actresses from Caracas
Venezuelan film actresses
Venezuelan telenovela actresses
RCTV personalities
1981 births
Living people
20th-century Venezuelan actresses
21st-century Venezuelan actresses
Venezuelan people of Mexican descent